On 28 April 2010, the Ministry of Road Transport and Highways officially notified the rationalized number system of the national highway network in the Gazette of the Government of India. It is a systematic numbering scheme based on the orientation and the geographic location of the highway. This was adopted to ensure more flexibility and consistency in the numbering of existing and new national highways. According to the system all north–south oriented highway will have even numbers increasing from the east to the west. Similarly all east–west oriented highways will be odd numbered increasing from the north to the south of the country.

The longest National Highway in new numbering scheme is National Highway 44.

The shortest National Highway was the NH 47A, which connected Kundanoor Junction of Maradu in Kochi city to the Kochi port at Willingdon Island. India has the distinction of having the world's highest drivable highway connecting Manali to Leh in Ladakh, Kashmir.

The table below shows the list of National Highways, prior to their renumbering in 2010–11 and their newly assigned numbers. For the list of current highway numbers see List of National Highways in India.

List of highways

See also 
 List of National Highways in India by state (old numbering)
 National Highways Authority of India
 National Highways Development Project

References

External links 
 Official website of the National Highways Authority of India (NHAI)
 Map of all the National Highways
 
 
 

Lists of roads in India
India transport-related lists